is a Japanese professional shogi player ranked 8-dan.

Early life
Izumi was born on January 11, 1961, in Nerima, Tokyo. He entered the Japan Shogi Association's apprentice school under the guidance of shogi professional  at the rank of 6-kyū in 1973. He was promoted to 1-dan in 1977 and obtained full professional status and the rank of 4-dan in August 1980.

Shogi professional
Izumi is a member of the so-called  (55年組), a group of eight strong players that become professional in 1980–1981 (Year 55 of the Shōwa period) and won numerous shogi tournaments.

Izumi became the 51st shogi professional to win 600 official games when he defeated Kōichi Kinoshita in a 59th Ōi tournament preliminary round game on October 4, 2017.

In March 2019, Izumi voluntarily declared himself as a free class player, thus leaving the Meijin tournament league.

Promotion history
Izumi's promotion history is as follows:

 6-kyū: 1973
 1-dan: 1977
 4-dan: August 20, 1980
 5-dan: April 26, 1985
 6-dan: June 23, 1989
 7-dan: October 9, 1997
 8-dan: July 4, 2013

Awards and honors
Izumi received the Japan Shogi Association's "25 Years Service Award" in 2005 in recognition of being an active professional for twenty-five years, and the "Shogi Honor Award" in 2017 in recognition of winning 600 official games as a professional.

References

External links
 ShogiHub: Professional Player Info · Izumi, Masaki

Japanese shogi players
Living people
Professional shogi players
Professional shogi players from Tokyo
People from Nerima
1961 births